Pål Herman Christiansen (born 9 September 1958, Oslo) is a Norwegian novelist and children's book author.

Biography 

Christiansen was born in Oslo in 1958. From 1973 to 1977 he attended Oslo Commerce School. In 1978 he studied law at the University of Oslo where he later dropped out. In 1985 Christiansen took a short writing course at the Telemark University College.

In 1989 he debuted his first novel "Harry var ikke ved sine fulle fem" (Harry was not in his right mind). He has since released a total of five novels and eleven children's books. His novel "Drømmer om storhet" from 2002 got attention from fans of pop group a-ha worldwide and the English version "The Scoundrel Days of Hobo Highbrow" was published in 2008. In 1996 Christiansen became a member of the Norwegian Authors' Union.

Christiansen was the recipient of the 2001 Tiden-prisen Prize for his distinct voice in the literary landscape.

Bibliography
2002 – The Scoundrel Days of Hobo Highbrow (Drømmer om storhet) – translated into English by Jon Buscall in 2008

Awards and prizes
2001: Tiden-prisen Prize

References

External links
 

1958 births
Living people
Norwegian children's writers
20th-century Norwegian novelists
21st-century Norwegian novelists